Buzhakan, also Romanized as Bujhakan; formerly, Babakishi), is a village in the Kotayk Province of Armenia. It is situated along the eastern foothills of the Tsaghkunyats mountain range, upon a fertile slope. Early settlers of the village began immigrating to the area in 1829 from Bitlis, Artsap, Alashkert, Mush, Sasun, and Khoy. The community has a school, kindergarten, and a library. In a wooded area to the north of Buzhakan is the well-known 10th-14th century Teghenyats Monastery, and to the east of the village are the ruins of a 6th-7th century church.

Gallery

See also 
Kotayk Province

References 

World Gazeteer: Armenia – World-Gazetteer.com

Populated places in Kotayk Province